In June 2007 the Office of the Premier of the Mpumalanga province in South Africa leaked a draft Mpumalanga Witchcraft Suppression Bill of 2007.

Unlike the Witchcraft Suppression Act of 1957 (which was directed against witch-hunting), the proposed Witchcraft Control Act would explicitly acknowledge the existence of witchcraft and criminalise it.

Drafting of the Bill was suspended the following year following opposition from traditional healers and Neopagans which also led to a review of existing national witchcraft legislation by the South African Law Reform Commission.

Background

Despite the ongoing existence of the national Witchcraft Suppression Act of 1957 based on colonial witchcraft legislation, which criminalises the "pretence of witchcraft" and accusations of witchcraft, violent witch-hunts have persisted in rural areas of South Africa. Various legislative reforms have been proposed to try and address this complex problem.

The principal tenets of the ANC's 1994 National Health Plan with respect to traditional healers include the right of access to traditional practitioners as part of their cultural heritage and belief system and the control of traditional practitioners by a recognised and accepted body so that harmful practices can be eliminated and the profession promoted. This ultimately led to the national Traditional Health Practitioners Act of 2007 which the National Department of Health only started to implement in December 2011 under pressure from frustrated traditional healers.

In 1995 the Minister of Safety and Security of the Northern Province commissioned the Commission of Enquiry into Witchcraft Violence and Ritual Murder in the Northern Province of the Republic of South Africa chaired by Professor Victor Ralushai. The Committee proposed a new national Witchcraft Control Act including penalties for practising, or pretending to practise, witchcraft and also recommended new legislation to regulate traditional healers. Unlike the Witchcraft Suppression Act of 1957, the proposed Witchcraft Control Act would explicitly acknowledge the existence of witchcraft and criminalise it.

The Ralushai Commission defined a witch as follows in their report:

Testifying before a Truth and Reconciliation Commission amnesty hearing in July 1999 about his knowledge about witchcraft matters and other related issues, Professor Ralushai defined a witch as follows when requested to do so by practising attorney Patrick Ndou:

In 1998 the Commission for Gender Equality issued the Thohoyandou Declaration on Ending Witchcraft Violence, recommending urgent legislative reform to mitigate harmful witchcraft practices and violent witch hunts including new legislation to regulate the practices and conduct of traditional healers.

The draft Mpumalanga Witchcraft Suppression Bill of 2007 expanded on the Witchcraft Suppression Act of 1957, defining witchcraft as harmful magic and attempting to regulate the conduct of traditional healers in Mpumalanga.

Mandate

The Mpumalanga Department of Local Government was mandated by the Provincial Executive Council to draft a Bill to address the high level of violence in the province caused by allegations of witchcraft.

The Bill was mentioned in the 2007/08 Budget speech for the Mpumalanga Provincial Government's Department of Local Government and Housing delivered on 31 May 2007:

Opposition to the Bill

In July 2007 members of organisations representing Neopagans and traditional healers met with officials of the Mpumalanga Provincial Government's Department of Local Government and Housing to discuss their concerns about the Bill from very different cultural viewpoints.
 
Pagans who self-identify as Witches, albeit in a contemporary Western sense, objected to the unconstitutional suppression of their religious beliefs and practices and the negative stereotype of witchcraft in the Bill:

 

Traditional healers objected to an inyanga, a local term for a traditional healer, and muti, a local term for medicine, being associated with harmful practices and traditional healers effectively being labelled as witches, the witch term having strong negative connotations in an Afrocentric context:

Suspension of the Bill

On 24 June 2008 the Mpumalanga Provincial Government issued a statement that they had suspended drafting of the Bill until further notice after consultation with different stakeholders.

South African Law Reform Commission review of witchcraft legislation

The South African Pagan Rights Alliance first approached the South African Law Reform Commission regarding the constitutionality of the Witchcraft Suppression Act of 1957 in February 2007, prior to the leaking of the Mpumalanga Bill. The South African Law Reform Commission subsequently received further submissions from the South African Pagan Rights Alliance and the Traditional Healers Organization requesting the investigation of the constitutionality of both the Witchcraft Suppression Act of 1957 and the Mpumalanga Witchcraft Suppression Bill of 2007. On 23 March 2010 the Minister of Justice and Constitutional Development approved a South African Law Reform Commission project to review witchcraft legislation.

In March 2012 the South African Law Reform Commission advised that Ms Jennifer Joni has been designated as researcher and Judge Dennis Davis has been designated as project leader for Project 135: Review of witchcraft legislation. Dr Theodore Petrus, who completed a doctoral thesis on witchcraft-related crime in 2009, was invited to become part of an advisory committee to assist in the review.

See also
 Tagati
 Witch smeller

References

External links
 Full text of the draft Mpumalanga Witchcraft Suppression Bill
 South African Pagan Rights Alliance (SAPRA)
 Traditional Healers Organization (THO)

African witchcraft
Religion in South Africa
Witchcraft Acts
Witchcraft Suppression Bill
2007 in South African law
Proposed laws